Giorgio Pennacchietti (born 21 October 1931) is an Italian former sports shooter. He competed in the 25 m pistol event at the 1952 Summer Olympics.

References

1931 births
Living people
Italian male sport shooters
Olympic shooters of Italy
Shooters at the 1952 Summer Olympics
Sportspeople from Bologna